Aleksandr Georgijewitsch Komarov (25 July 1923 − 22 November 2013) was a Soviet ice hockey player who played for HC CSKA Moscow in the Soviet Hockey League. He was inducted into the Russian and Soviet Hockey Hall of Fame in 1954.

References

External links
 Russian and Soviet Hockey Hall of Fame bio

1923 births
2013 deaths
Sportspeople from Khabarovsk
Soviet ice hockey players
HC CSKA Moscow players